Jack Palmer (May 29, 1899 – March 17, 1976) was an American pianist and composer. He is best known for co-writing two jazz standards with Spencer Williams: "Everybody Loves My Baby" and "I've Found a New Baby".

Born in Nashville, Tennessee, Palmer worked on New York City's Tin Pan Alley as a staff writer and wrote songs with many different co-authors. With Cab Calloway he wrote two film soundtrack hits, "Jumpin' Jive" (1939) and "Boog It" (1940).

Notes

External links
 Jack Palmer recordings at the Discography of American Historical Recordings.

1899 births
1976 deaths
American male composers
20th-century American composers
20th-century American pianists
American male pianists
20th-century American male musicians